Suzanne Paradis (born 27 October 1932) is a Canadian poet, novelist and critic based in Quebec. Paradis was born in Quebec City, Quebec.

Books
 Pour les enfants des morts
 A temps, le bonheur
 Les Hauts Cris
 La Chasse aux autres
 Les Cormorans
 L'Oeuvre de pierre
 Pour voir les plectrophanes naitre
 Emmanuelle en noir
 Il y eut un matin
 La Voie sauvage
 Quand la terre etait toujours jeune
 L'ete sera chaud
 Noir sur sang
 Un Portrait de Jeanne Joron
 Poemes, 1959, 1960, 1961
 Adrienne Choquette lue par Suzanne Paradis
 Miss Charlie
 Les Chevaux de verre
 Un gout de sel
 Un Aigle dans la basse-cour
 La Ligne bleue

References

Sources
 Dictionary of Literary Biography, Volume 53: Canadian Writers Since 1960, Page 318
 Suzanne Paradis entry in The Canadian Encyclopedia
 Suzanne Paradis entry in the Dictionary of Literary Biography
 Suzanne Paradis entry in L'île, L'infocentre littéraire des écrivains québécois site

1936 births
20th-century Canadian poets
Canadian women poets
Living people
Canadian poets in French
Canadian women novelists
Writers from Quebec City
20th-century Canadian women writers
Canadian novelists in French
20th-century Canadian novelists